The MV Quinsam is an automobile ferry operated by BC Ferries. It was built in 1982 by Vancouver Shipyards in Vancouver, British Columbia. The ferry was originally part of the Ministry of Transportation and Highways' (MoT) saltwater ferry fleet until 1985, when the MoT's saltwater ferries—including Quinsam—were transferred to BC Ferries.

Quinsam carries 70 cars and replaced the smaller  (which carries fifty cars) on the Nanaimo ↔ Gabriola Island route, and then once again on the Vesuvius ↔ Crofton route in 2022.

Quinsam has few passenger amenities on board. On each side of the car deck, there are small passenger lounges where there is some seating, as well as washrooms and vending machines. In 2010, she underwent a $16 million mid-life upgrade where she received new engines and generators, a rebuilt pilothouse and passenger cabin, as well as steel replacement.

References

1982 ships
Ships built in British Columbia